Kathinka von Deichmann was the defending champion, but lost to Arantxa Rus in the second round.

Barbora Krejčíková won the title, defeating Katarina Zavatska in the final, 6–4, 7–6(7–2).

Seeds

Draw

Finals

Top half

Bottom half

References

Main Draw

Wiesbaden Tennis Open - Singles